Şaziye İvegin (born 8 February 1982) is a Turkish retired professional basketball player.  

A basketball player’s daughter, İvegin started basketball in 7th school class on the same day together with her two younger sisters. The three sisters played in the Adana-based club Botaşspor and won twice the Turkish Girls’ Basketball League championship title. At her age of 22, she became the youngest women's basketball team captain in the country. After 10 successful years with Botaş, İvegin transferred to Fenerbahçe on May 7, 2004.

İvegin was member of the Turkish national team that participated at the 2005 Mediterranean Games in Almería, Spain and won the gold medal.

She is a student of business administration at the Anadolu University.

Achievements

Botaş
Ronchetti Cup (Euro Cup)
2nd with Botaş: 2000
Turkish Youth Championship
Winners: 1999, 2000
Turkish Championship
Winners: 2001
Turkish Cup
Winners: 2002, 2003
Turkish Presidents Cup
Winners: 2002, 2003

Fenerbahçe
Turkish Championship
Winners: 2004, 2006, 2007, 2011
Turkish Cup
Winners: 2004, 2005, 2006, 2007
Turkish Presidents Cup
Winners: 2004, 2005, 2007, 2010
FIBA Europe
2004 : 4th place at Final Four
2005 : 2nd place at Final Four

Galatasaray
EuroCup Women
Winners: 2008–09

Turkey National
 2002–2003
 European 4th with Turkey U20 national team
 2005
 Mediterranean Games gold medal with Turkey women’s national team

See also
Turkish women in sports

References

External links
Profile at tbl.org.tr
Player Profile at Eurobasket Women 2009
Player profil on fibaeurope.com

1982 births
Living people
Abdullah Gül Üniversitesi basketball players
Basketball players at the 2012 Summer Olympics
Basketball players at the 2016 Summer Olympics
Beşiktaş women's basketball players
Botaş SK players
Fenerbahçe women's basketball players
Galatasaray S.K. (women's basketball) players
Mersin Büyükşehir Belediyesi women's basketball players
Olympic basketball players of Turkey
People from Niksar
Small forwards
Turkish expatriate basketball people in Italy
Turkish expatriate basketball people in Russia
Turkish women's basketball players
Survivor Turkey contestants